The 1904 Mississippi A&M Aggies football team represented the Mississippi A&M Aggies of Agricultural and Mechanical College of the State of Mississippi during the 1904 Southern Intercollegiate Athletic Association football season.

Schedule

References

Mississippi AandM
Mississippi State Bulldogs football seasons
Mississippi AandM Aggies football